New Delhi is a 1956 Indian Hindi-language black and white romantic comedy film written by Radhakishen with Inder Raj Anand and directed by Mohan Segal. The film starred  Vyjayanthimala and Kishore Kumar in the lead, with Jabeen Jalil, Nana Palsikar, Nazir Hussain, Prabhu Dayal, Dhumal, Brahm Bhardwaj, Radhakrishan, Mumtaz Begum, Mirza Musharraf and Shivraj as the ensemble cast. The film was produced by Mohan Segal himself. The film's score was composed by Shankar Jaikishan duo with lyrics provided by Hasrat Jaipuri and Shailendra, edited by Pratap Dave and was filmed by K. H. Kapadia. The story is about the Punjabi boy Anand and the Tamil girl Janaki who fall in love with each other, but unfortunately were separated by their families.

Plot
Anand (Kishore Kumar), a Punjabi boy comes from Jalandhar to Delhi, but is unable to find a place to stay, as everywhere he goes people want to give room only to a person of their region. Desperate, Anand masquerades as a Tamilian, Anand Kumaraswamy, and finds a place to stay with a Tamilian family. There, he meets the daughter of the South Indian Cultural Association Head, Janaki (Vyjayantimala). Romance develops, but Anand is unable to reveal his true identity to her. Daulatram Khanna Nazir Hussain, Anand's father and Janaki's father, Subramanyam's (Nana Palsikar) superior, gets transferred to Delhi. Anand's sister Nikki (Jabeen) comes close to Anand's friend, Ashok Banerjee, a Bengali painter who teaches her art. Anand makes his Tamilian servant Kumaraswamy (Dhoomal) masquerade as his father and they even meet Janaki's father to discuss the marriage. But soon they are found out and Daulatram opposes the marriage. Daulatram also faces opposition from his community who come to discuss Nikki's marriage within the community. Subramanyam too turns against his daughter, who tries to kill herself. She is saved by a kindly shop owner (Radhakishen) and passed off as his Punjabi niece, Mohini. Both Subramanyam and Anand are kept in the dark and are convinced Janaki is no more. Subramanyam realizes his mistake, but sadly he thinks it is too late. Thinking Mohini to be a good Punjabi girl, Anand's family readily agrees to his marriage with her. Daulatram returns home to find Ashok consoling Nikki, and throws him out. Nikki's marriage is almost called off when the boy's father demands a huge dowry. Ashok offers his family jewels to Daulatram so that Nikki's marriage can take place. Daulatram's eyes open and he calls off the wedding and marries Nikki to Ashok. The truth about Janaki/ Mohini also comes out and now that both groups have shed their prejudices Anand marries Janaki.

Cast
 Kishore Kumar as Anand D. Khanna / Anand Kumar Swami 
 Vyjayantimala as Janki Subramanian / Mohini
 Jabeen as Nirmala 'Nikki' D. Khanna 
 Prabhu Dayal as Ashok Bannerji
 Nazir Hussain as Lala Daulatram Khanna 
 Nana Palsikar as Subramaniam
 Dhumal as Kumar Swami
 Radha Kishan as Sadhuram
 Mumtaz Begum as Daulatram's Wife
 Mirza Musharaf as Daulatram's friend
 Sarita		
 Ramlal	
 Shamlal
 Bharadwaj as Daulatram's friend
 Mulraj Kapur
 P.R.Kapur
 Sachin Ghosh
 Bingoo	
 Sheela Kashmiri
 Shivraj as Chunilal

Reviews
A review of the film was written on Uperstall about the main characters:
 "Vyjayanthimala proves to be the perfect foil for Kishore Kumar[...]has always had the mandatory dance sequence in practically every film of hers evoking 'classical art' associations. She excels in the two main dances in New Delhi - the solo Bharatnatayam Aliruppu number and the Bhangra folk dance in her Punjabi avatar and she is absolutely brilliant in the Bhangra folk dance[...]in her second avtar even Vyjayanthimala played a Punjabi girl and most successfully too".
 "Kishore Kumar is in full form and carries the film on his shoulders. His comic timing is spot on and he is as energetic as ever. The traditional concept of a comedian has always been one of lowly stature, that of a sidekick. It was Kishore Kumar who successfully became Hindi cinema's comic hero whose popularity relied primarily on his comic talents. Add to that his phenomenal acting talent and amazing singing voice and you have a performer who bordered on the genius".
 "Jabeen Jalil as Kishore Kumar's sister, Nikki is a big no-no coming up woefully short in both the looks and histrionic departments".
 "The lead duo are ably supported by Nana Palsikar. Palsikar from Maharashtra played a Tamilian[...]and most successfully too".

Soundtrack
The film's soundtrack was composed by Shankar Jaikishan duo while the lyrics were provided by Hasrat Jaipuri and Shailendra. All the songs in this film became very successful.

Box office
At the end of its theatrical run, the film grossed around 1,45,00,000 and netted 75,00,000, thus becomes the sixth highest-grossing film of 1956, with a verdict of "hit".

See also
 RG Anand v. Deluxe Films

References

External links
 
 New Delhi profile & review at Upperstall.com

1956 films
1950s Hindi-language films
Indian black-and-white films
1956 romantic comedy films
Films scored by Shankar–Jaikishan
Indian romantic comedy films